Pavlos Tzanavaras is a Greek long-distance and trail runner. He was born in 1969 in Athikia, Corinth where he still resides.

He holds the Panhellenic record in 10.000 meters for the M45 age category, with a time of 1:15:33 achieved in 2014 at Bucharest, Romania. In 2008 in Belgrade, he was placed 2nd at the Balkan Marathon Road Championship with a time of 2:41:02. He was also placed 3rd with a time of 1:06:09, on the first Panhellenic Trailroad Championship, organised by SEGAS in 2011 on the slopes of Parnitha.

He was competing for Panathinaikos until 2021.

References

1969 births
Living people
Greek male long-distance runners
Panathinaikos Athletics
Sportspeople from the Peloponnese
People from Corinthia